Gert Jakobs (born 29 April 1964) is a Dutch former racing cyclist. He rode in ten Grand Tours between 1986 and 1993. He also competed in the team time trial event at the 1984 Summer Olympics. Jakobs has admitted to have used EPO during his career. Epo was not yet on the doping list in 1989, so he did not violate the dopingrules with it.

See also
 List of Dutch Olympic cyclists

References

External links

1964 births
Living people
Cyclists at the 1984 Summer Olympics
Doping cases in cycling
Dutch male cyclists
Dutch sportspeople in doping cases
Olympic cyclists of the Netherlands
Sportspeople from Emmen, Netherlands
Cyclists from Drenthe
20th-century Dutch people